Riverton Airport  is located  south of Riverton, Manitoba, Canada.

References

Registered aerodromes in Manitoba